Plum Creek is a stream in the U.S. state of Ohio.

Plum Creek was named for the plum trees which once lined its banks.

See also
List of rivers of Ohio

References

Rivers of Allen County, Ohio
Rivers of Putnam County, Ohio
Rivers of Ohio